There have been two formations named British Army of the Rhine (BAOR). Both were originally occupation forces in Germany, one after the First World War and the other after the Second World War. Both formations had areas of responsibility located around the German section of the River Rhine.

History

1919–1929

The first British Army of the Rhine was set up in March 1919 to implement the occupation of the Rhineland. It was originally composed of five corps, composed of two divisions each, plus a cavalry division:

II Corps: Commanded by Sir Claud Jacob
 Light Division (formed from 2nd Division): Commanded by Major-General George Jeffreys
 Southern Division (formed from 29th Division): Commanded by Major-General William Heneker
IV Corps: Commanded by Sir Alexander Godley
 Lowland Division (formed from 9th Division)
 Highland Division (formed from 62nd Division)
VI Corps: Commanded by Sir Aylmer Haldane
 Northern Division (formed from 3rd Division)
 London Division (formed from 41st Division)
IX Corps: Commanded by Sir Walter Braithwaite and later by Ivor Maxse
 Western Division (formed from 1st Division)
 Midland Division (formed from 6th Division)
X Corps: Commanded by Sir Thomas Morland
 Lancashire Division (formed from 32nd Division)
 Eastern Division (formed from 34th Division)
Cavalry Division (formed from 1st Cavalry Division)

Most of these units were progressively dissolved, so that by February 1920 there were only regular battalions:

 1st Battalion Royal Irish Regiment
 4th Battalion Worcestershire Regiment
 2nd Battalion Black Watch (Royal Highlanders)
 1st Battalion Middlesex Regiment
 3rd Battalion Middlesex Regiment
 1st Battalion Durham Light Infantry

In August 1920 Winston Churchill, as Secretary of State for War, told Parliament that the BAOR was made up of approximately 13,360 troops, consisting of staff, cavalry, Royal Artillery, Royal Engineers, infantry, machine gun corps, tanks and the usual ancillary services. The troops were located principally in the vicinity of Cologne at an approximate cost per month of £300,000. The Cologne Post was a newspaper published for members of the BAOR during this period.

From 1922 the BAOR was organised into two brigades:

1st Rhine Brigade
 1st Battalion Northumberland Fusiliers  1922–1926
 1st Battalion West Yorkshire Regiment  1922–1926
 2nd Battalion Queen's Own Cameron Highlanders  1922–1926
 1st Battalion York and Lancaster Regiment 1922–1924
 2nd Battalion Royal Berkshire Regiment  1926–1928
 2nd Battalion Royal Welch Fusiliers  Nov 1926 – Oct 1929
 2nd Battalion Worcestershire Regiment  1926–1928

2nd Rhine Brigade
 2nd Battalion Duke of Cornwall's Light Infantry  1922–1924
 1st Battalion King's Own Yorkshire Light Infantry  1922–1924
 2nd Battalion King's Royal Rifle Corps  1922–1925
 1st Battalion Royal Ulster Rifles  1922–1926
 1st Battalion Manchester Regiment  1923–1924
 2nd Battalion King's Shropshire Light Infantry  1924–1927
 1st Battalion Oxford and Bucks Light Infantry  1925–1927
 2nd Battalion Royal Fusiliers  1926–1929
 2nd Battalion Leicestershire Regiment  1927–1929
 2nd Battalion Dorsetshire Regiment  1928–1929

Commanders-in-chief
The commanders were:
 Field Marshal Lord Plumer 1918–1919
 General Sir William Robertson 1919–1920
 General Sir Thomas Morland 1920–1922
 General Sir Alexander Godley 1922–1924
 General Sir John Du Cane 1924–1927
 General Sir William Thwaites 1927–1929

1945–1994

The second British Army of the Rhine was formed on 25 August 1945 from the British Liberation Army. Its original function was to control the corps districts which were running the military government of the British zone of Allied-occupied Germany. After the assumption of government by civilians, it became the command formation for the troops in Germany only, rather than being responsible for administration as well.

As the potential threat of Soviet invasion across the North German Plain into West Germany increased, BAOR became more responsible for the defence of West Germany than its occupation. It became the primary formation controlling the British contribution to NATO after the formation of the alliance in 1949. Its primary combat formation was British I Corps. From 1952 the commander-in-chief of the BAOR was also the commander of NATO's Northern Army Group (NORTHAG) in the event of a general war with the Soviet Union and its Warsaw Pact allies. The BAOR was formerly armed with tactical nuclear weapons. In 1967, the force was reduced in strength to 53,000 soldiers, compared with 80,000 ten years earlier.

Post 1994
With the end of the Cold War, the 1993 Options for Change defence cuts resulted in BAOR being reduced in size, and in 1994 it became British Forces Germany (BFG). This force, roughly 25,000 strong, was divided between Headquarters Allied Command Europe Rapid Reaction Corps, 1st Armoured Division, other combat support and combat service support forces, and administrative elements headed by United Kingdom Support Command (Germany). Garrisons which closed at this time included Soest (home of the 6th Armoured Brigade), Soltau (home of the 7th Armoured Brigade) and Minden (home of the 11th Armoured Brigade).

Following the 2010 Strategic Defence and Security Review, the permanent deployment of British Army units in Germany began to be phased out, with the last military base handed back to the German Bundeswehr in February 2020.

Commanders-in-chief
The commanders were:
 Field Marshal Viscount Montgomery  1945–1946
 Lieutenant General Sir Richard McCreery 1946–1948
 Lieutenant General Sir Brian Horrocks 1948
 Lieutenant General Sir Charles Keightley 1948–1951
 General Sir John Harding 1951–1952
 General Sir Richard Gale 1952–1957
 General Sir Dudley Ward 1957–1960
 General Sir James Cassels 1960–1963
 General Sir William Stirling 1963–1966
 General Sir John Hackett 1966–1968
 General Sir Desmond Fitzpatrick 1968–1970
 General Sir Peter Hunt 1970–1973
 General Sir Harry Tuzo 1973–1976
 General Sir Frank King 1976–1978
 General Sir William Scotter 1978–1980
 General Sir Michael Gow 1980–1983
 General Sir Nigel Bagnall 1983–1985
 General Sir Martin Farndale 1985–1987
 General Sir Brian Kenny 1987–1989
 General Sir Peter Inge 1989–1992
 General Sir Charles Guthrie 1992 – May 1994 (command disbanded)

Garrisons
 Bergen-Hohne Garrison
 Osnabrück Garrison
 Westfalen Garrison

See also
 British military history
 Canadian Forces Europe
 British Forces Germany
 Mixed Service Organisation

Notes

References
 The Original British Army of the Rhine by Richard A. Rinaldi
 Peter Blume :  BAOR – Vehicles Of The British Army Of The Rhine – Fahrzeuge der Britischen Rheinarmee – 1945–1979  Tankograd 2006.
 Peter Blume :  BAOR : The Final Years  – Vehicles Of The British Army Of The Rhine – Fahrzeuge der Britischen Rheinarmee – 1980–1994 Tankograd 2007.
 T.J. Gander : British Army of the Rhine Ian Allan Publishing, Londres 1984.
 Thomas Laber : British Army of the Rhine – Armored Vehicles on exercise, Concord Publications, Hong Kong 1991.
 Carl Schulze : British Army Of The Rhine, Diane Pub Co 1995.
 Graham Watson & Richard A. Rinaldi : The British Army in Germany: An Organizational History 1947–2004 , Tiger Lily Publications LLC 2005.

External links
 
 Royal Engineers Museum Royal Engineers and the British Army of the Rhine
 BAOR Locations British Army of the Rhine Locations
 British Army Locations from 1945 British Army Locations from 1945

A
British Army deployments
British forces in Germany
Allied occupation of Germany
Military units and formations established in 1945
Military units and formations disestablished in 1994
Rhine
Rhine
1945 establishments in Germany
1994 disestablishments in Germany
Military units and formations of the British Empire in World War II